Peter Richard Markland (born 13 April 1951 in Bolton, Lancashire) is a British chess player. He was a member of the British team at the Chess Olympiads in 1972 and 1974. Markland was listed as the highest ranked British chess player in the first official FIDE Elo list, published in July 1971.

Since 1984, Markland is an ICCF Grandmaster. He is also an FIDE Master since 2021.

He worked as a banker and lives in Woodbridge, Suffolk.

Bibliography 
 The Best of Karpov (1975)
 The Sicilian Richter-Rauzer [with Tim Harding] (1975)
 Sicilian: ...E5 [with Tim Harding] (1976)

References

External links
 
 
 

1951 births
Living people
British chess players
Correspondence chess grandmasters
Chess FIDE Masters